The Danab Brigade (Somali: Ciidamada Danab, "Lightning Force") is a highly trained Somali National Army commando force. Its strikes have repeatedly raided land in quick succession previously held by Somali Al-Qaeda linked insurgents Al-Shabaab.

History 
In February 2014, U.S. contractors concluded a six-month training course for the first Commandos since 1991. Training had been carried out by Bancroft Global Development, a U.S. private military contractor, paid by AMISOM which is then reimbursed by the U.S. State Department. The aim was to create a mixed-clan unit. The Danab unit was established at Baledogle Airfield, in Walaweyn District, Lower Shabelle. The training of the first Danab unit began in October 2013, with  150 recruits. As of July 2014, training of the second unit was underway. According to General Elmi, the training is geared toward both urban and rural environments, and is aimed at preparing the soldiers for guerrilla warfare and all other types of modern military operations. Elmi said that a total of 570 Commandos are expected to have completed training by U.S. security personnel by the end of 2014.

The initial training proved to be very successful; thus, the United States began to expand the capability into a 3,000 - 3,500 man brigade. AFRICOM, SOCAF, and contractors trained new recruits and barracks were repaired and expanded at Baledogle Airfield.

Over the years 2018 and 2019, the Danab battalion has regularly carried out strikes that have crippled al Shabaab capabilities. Operations undertaken by Danab sometime have direct involvement with US forces; in particular, joint terminal attack controllers have been used to direct artillery and close air support for Danab units when they are engaging with terrorist groups. Danab commandos have been proven as a capable force.

Many cadets also undertake training at Camp TURKSOM and regularly graduate, these commandos are being trained by Turkish forces as part of Task Force "African Eagle" (Turkish: Afrika Kartalı). These graduates, instead of bearing the sand Infantry berets, wear the unique sky blue beret.

Uniform & Camouflage 

Danab commandos service uniform is the same as the SNA but instead have the patch of their emblem on their left shoulder and have a paratrooper insignia on their left breast of their uniform and may wear airborne tab on their shoulder. The brigade mainly use tiger stripe and desert digital camouflage opposed to the mainly woodland camouflage that the SNA use and the urban digital camouflage the NISA use as well, The brigade does use the sand beret but if a unit's function differ, they'll use the beret colour to suit their function (i.e. for Presidential Security, they'll use red berets or helmets with "B.D." inscribed on them). Danab commandos utilise kevlar vests, tactical helmets with nightvision goggles and other higher end equipment in combat.

References 

https://sofrep.com/news/us-conducts-another-airstrike-against-al-shabaab-in-somalia-as-the-debate-over-their-legality-continues/

Danab
Danab Brigade
Military units and formations established in 2013